The Manchester, Point and Wabash bridge piers are former bridge piers from three different bridges at different locations in Pittsburgh, Pennsylvania.  The Manchester Bridge opened in 1915, and connected the North Shore to The Point of Pittsburgh.  The bridge was demolished in 1970, and only the northern pier was left standing for a proposed observation deck that was never built.  In 2009, the pier was made into an arched walkway leading up to a statue of Fred Rogers.  Former bridge piers such as this one from the Manchester Bridge, as well as former piers from the Point Bridge (1927) and the Wabash Bridge (1903), were added to the List of Pittsburgh History and Landmarks Foundation Historic Landmarks in 1977.

References

Transportation buildings and structures in Pittsburgh